Ray Montgomery (May 27, 1922 – June 4, 1998) was an American actor.

Biography

Academics
He graduated from Los Angeles High School in June 1940. Upon graduation from high school, he studied journalism at the University of Southern California. He was the winner of the 1940 national declamation finals in the National Forensic League Tournament at Terre Haute, Indiana,

Military career
Montgomery was in a cadet in the Naval Reserve Officers Training Corps while at the University of Southern California. He served in the Merchant Marine Naval Reserve during World War II. He served from October 1942 to August 1945.

Radio
When he was 18 and still in college, Montgomery played Noel Chandler in the soap opera Dear John.

Television
Montgomery had the role of Professor Howard Ogden in the syndicated children's adventure series Ramar of the Jungle in 1952–1953. Ogden was a colleague of the main character, Dr. Tom Reynolds (called "Ramar" by the natives). He starred in the pilot of The West Point Story, a syndicated program about cadets at the United States Military Academy, and appeared in the premiere episode of Alfred Hitchcock Presents, October 2, 1955.  In 1955 Montgomery appeared as Morton Scott in the TV western Cheyenne in the episode titled "Julesburg." In 1960, he portrayed a police officer in The Tom Ewell Show episode "The Safety Lesson."

Post-acting career
In 1957, Montgomery left acting to join Ad-Staff Inc., a "Hollywood firm specializing in creation and production of jingles and other radio and tv spots," as the TV coordinator for the firm's Canada Dry account in the West.

Family
Montgomery was married to Jean Trent, a "beautiful Universal starlet."

Selected filmography

 You're in the Army Now (1941) – Soldier (uncredited)
 All Through the Night (1942) – Reporter (uncredited)
 Captains of the Clouds (1942) – Aircraftsman Hodges (uncredited)
 Bullet Scars (1942) – News Photographer at Shootout (uncredited)
 The Male Animal (1942) – Student (uncredited)
 Murder in the Big House (1942) – Young Reporter (uncredited)
 Larceny, Inc. (1942) – Second Customer (uncredited)
 Wings for the Eagle (1942) – Young Man Talking to Jake (uncredited)
 The Gay Sisters (1942) – Joe – Records Clerk (uncredited)
 The Hard Way (1943) – Johnny Gilpin (uncredited)
 Air Force (1943) – Asst. Radio Operator
 Action in the North Atlantic (1943) – Aherne (scenes deleted)
 Murder on the Waterfront (1943) – Forceful Sailor (uncredited)
 Deception (1946) – Wedding Guest (uncredited)
 The Unfaithful (1947) – Ray, Hunter's Assistant (uncredited)
 Dark Passage (1947) – Theatre Usher in Trailer (uncredited)
 The Unsuspected (1947) – Reporter (uncredited)
 That Hagen Girl (1947) – Jimmy / Romeo – College Student in Play (uncredited)
 To the Victor (1948) – Soldier (uncredited)
 Silver River (1948) – Young Man (uncredited)
 Wallflower (1948) – Chester aka Chet (uncredited)
 Romance on the High Seas (1948) – Michael's Assistant (uncredited)
 The Big Punch (1948) – Man Reading Newspaper (uncredited)
 Embraceable You (1948) – Ambulance Driver (uncredited)
 Johnny Belinda (1948) – Tim Moore (uncredited)
 Smart Girls Don't Talk (1948) – Tommy—Auto Park Attendant (uncredited)
 June Bride (1948) – Jim Mitchell
 Fighter Squadron (1948) – Cpl. Walsh (uncredited)
 Whiplash (1948) – Press Man (uncredited)
 One Sunday Afternoon (1948) – Young Man in Park (uncredited)
 John Loves Mary (1949) – Elevator Operator / Trailer Host (uncredited)
 South of St. Louis (1949) – Soldier (uncredited)
 A Kiss in the Dark (1949) – Chet Hale (uncredited)
 The Girl from Jones Beach (1949) – Miss Brooks' Dancing Escort (uncredited)
 It's a Great Feeling (1949) – Raoul Walsh's Assistant (uncredited)
 Task Force (1949) – Pilot
 White Heat (1949) – Ernie (uncredited)
 The House Across the Street (1949) – Reporter (uncredited)
 The Lady Takes a Sailor (1949) – Lab Assistant (uncredited)
 Backfire (1950) – Attendant (uncredited)
 Tomahawk (1950) – Blair Streeter (uncredited)
 Mr. Belvedere Rings the Bell (1951) – Reporter (uncredited)
 People Will Talk (1951) – Doctor (uncredited)
 Love Nest (1951) – Mr. Gray (uncredited)
 Starlift (1951) – Capt. Nelson – Pilot (uncredited)
 The Las Vegas Story (1952) – Desk Clerk
 Bugles in the Afternoon (1952) – Osborne (uncredited)
 Diplomatic Courier (1952) – Co-Pilot (uncredited)
 Down Among the Sheltering Palms (1952) – Lt. Everty (uncredited)
 One Minute to Zero (1952) – (uncredited)
 Monkey Business (1952) as Policeman (uncredited)
 Stars and Stripes Forever (1952) as Maine NCO – Major's Aide (uncredited)
 The I Don't Care Girl (1953) as Army Lieutenant (uncredited)
 Column South (1953) – Trooper Keit (uncredited)
 Pickup on South Street (1953) – Ray – FBI Agent (uncredited)
 Gentlemen Prefer Blondes (1953) – Peters – Olympic Team (uncredited)
 Bandits of the West (1953) – Steve Edrington
 Sabre Jet (1953) – Maj. James Daniel
 Ramar of the Jungle (1953–1954, TV Series) – Professor Howard Ogden
 Sincerely Yours (1955) – Mr. Neff (scenes deleted)
 Hilda Crane (1956) – Hilda's Acquaintance on Train (uncredited)
 Between Heaven and Hell (1956) – Medic (uncredited)
 Three Brave Men (1956) – Sanford (uncredited)
 Bombers B-52 (1957) – Barnes
 Kiss Them for Me (1957) – Lt. (j.g.) (uncredited)
 Peyton Place (1957) – Naval Officer (uncredited)
 In Love and War (1958) – Lieutenant (uncredited)
 A Private's Affair (1959) – Capt. Hickman
 The FBI Story (1959) – Driver (uncredited)
 Cash McCall (1960) – Reporter (uncredited)
 House of Women (1962) – Mr. Everett (uncredited)
 Critic's Choice (1963) – Actor in 'Week End' (uncredited)
 A Gathering of Eagles (1963) – Capt. Line (uncredited)
 Wagon Train (1963) – George 
 Kisses for My President (1964) – Reporter (uncredited)
 Brainstorm (1965) – Charlie – Gate Guard (uncredited)
 The Silencers (1966) – Agent 'C' (uncredited)
 Not with My Wife, You Don't! (1966) – Staff Officer (uncredited)
 A Guide for the Married Man (1967) – Party Guest #5
 Madigan (1968) – Det. O'Mara

References

External links

Ray Montgomery at Turner Classic Movies

1922 births
1998 deaths
20th-century American male actors
American male film actors
American male radio actors
American male television actors
Los Angeles High School alumni
Male actors from Los Angeles
Merchant Marine Naval Reservists
Military personnel from California
United States Navy sailors
USC Annenberg School for Communication and Journalism alumni